XHLG-FM is a radio station on 98.3 FM in León, Guanajuato, Mexico. The station is owned by Promomedios and known as Ultra FM with a pop format.

History
XHLG received its first concession on May 19, 1970.

References

Radio stations in Guanajuato
Radio stations established in 1970